Bride-buying, also referred to as bride-purchasing, is the industry or trade of purchasing a bride as a form of property. This enables the bride to be resold or repurchased at the buyer's discretion. This practice continues to have a firm foothold in parts of the world such as China, India and Africa. Described as a form of marriage of convenience, the practice is illegal in many countries.

History 
One of the first recorded instances of bride-buying in North America can be traced back to 1619 in Jamestown, Virginia. The first Jamestown settlers were exclusively European males, historian Alf J. Mapp Jr believes this could be due to the belief that "...women had no place in the grim and often grisly business of subduing a continent..." With stories of famine, disease and dissension, the European women feared that leaving England and traveling to the colony would be of great risk. Unable to find wives, many men chose to desert the colony. In order to reduce desertion, colony leaders sent advertisements back to Europe, pleading for women to immigrate to the colony. Trying to persuade potential brides to come to Jamestown proved to be difficult, however, 17th-century marriage obstacles proved to be beneficial to the men of the colony. Attaining a home and constructing domestic household in Europe was costly. If not born into wealth, most people would need to obtain significant savings before being able to wed. The majority of working-class Englishwomen turned to domestic service to acquire the necessary funds to marry and marital immigration offered an enticing alternative to what otherwise would be years doing menial work for meager pay. The Virginia Company offered women who chose to leave England in favor of the colony generous incentives such as linens, clothing, a plot of land, and their choice of husband. After a husband was chosen, he would then pay the Virginia Company with 150 pounds (70kg) of "good leaf" tobacco (which is equivalent to roughly $5000 USD in today's currency) to pay for their bride's passage to the colony. This is how the Jamestown brides earned themselves the nickname the "tobacco brides".

Mail-order brides 

One of the most common forms of modern-day bride-buying is mail-order brides. It is estimated that there are 90 agencies that deal with the selling and purchasing of mail order brides. These agencies have websites that list the addresses, pictures, names and biographies of up to 25,000 women that are seeking husbands, with American husbands being the most common preference. While there are women listed on these sites from all over the world, the majority of mail-order brides come from Russia and the Philippines. According to these agencies, 10% of women who choose to become mail-order brides are successful and find a husband through their services. The agencies also state that there are around 10,000 mail-order marriages a year, with about 4,000 of these marriages involving men in the United States.

Bride-buying in Asia

China
Bride-buying is an old tradition in China.  The practice was largely stamped out by the current Chinese Communist government. However, the modern practice is "not unusual in rural villages"; it is also known as mercenary marriage. According to Ding Lu of the non-governmental organization All-China Women's Federation, the practice had a resurgence due to China's surging economy. From 1991 to 1996, Chinese police rescued upwards of 88,000 women and children who had been sold into marriage and slavery, and the Chinese government claimed that 143,000 traffickers involved were caught and prosecuted. Some human rights groups state that these figures are not correct and that the real number of abducted women is higher. Bay Fang and Mark Leong reported in U.S. News & World Report that "the government sees the commerce in wives as a shameful problem, it has only in recent years begun to provide any statistics, and it tries to put the focus on the women who have been saved rather than on the continuing trade."  Causes include poverty and bride shortage in the rural areas (rural women go to the cities to work). As women leave rural areas to find work in cities, they are considered more vulnerable to being "tricked or forced into becoming chattel for men desperate for wives."  The shortage of brides in turn is due to amplification of the traditional preference of Chinese couples for sons by the 1979 one-child policy in China. The Chinese Academy of Social Sciences estimated that in 1998 there were 120 men for every 100 women, with imbalances in rural areas being about 130 males for every 100 females. The increase in the cost of dowries is also a contributing factor leading men to buy women for wives. Human Rights in China states that it is more affordable for a man to buy a wife from a trafficker for 2,000 to 4,000 yuan than to pay a traditional dowry, which often runs upwards of 10,000 yuan. For the average urban worker, wife selling is an affordable option, since in 1998 at least; China urban workers made approximately $60 a month.  Brides for sale are outsourced from countries such as Burma, Laos, Pakistan, Vietnam and North Korea.  The bride-traders sell women as brides or as prostitutes depending on their physical appearance.  A common trick employed by bride-brokers in acquiring brides for sale is the offer of a job such as in factories and instead kidnapping them.  Bride-traders can sell a young woman for the price of $250 to $800USD.  US$50 to US$100 of the original price goes to the primary kidnappers while the rest of the income goes to the traffickers who bring the bride to the main client.

After bearing children, Chinese women who are bought as wives are more prone to staying within the marriage. Fang Yuzhu of the China Women's Federation credits it with a "strong sense of duty" that Chinese women have, and the idea that it is shameful to leave their husband. Yuzhu also credits that some women might consider their forced marriage a better option to the life of poverty and hard labor they would be subject to upon returning home or the idea that some women may not feel they can find another husband, since they "have already been with one".

India
Bride buying is an old practice in many regions in India. Bride-purchasing is common in the states of India such as Haryana, Jharkhand, and Punjab.  According to CNN-IBN, women are “bought, sold, trafficked, raped and married off without consent” across certain parts of India. Bride-purchases are usually outsourced from Bihar, Assam, and West Bengal. The price of the bride (locally known as paros in Jharkhand), if bought from the sellers, may cost between 4,000 and 30,000 Indian rupees, which is the equivalent of $88 to $660USD. The brides' parents are normally paid an average of 500 to 1,000 Indian rupees (around $11 to $22USD). The need to purchase a bride arises from the low female-to-male ratio. Such low ratio was caused by the preference to give birth sons instead of daughters, and female foeticide. In 2006, according to BBC News, there were around 861 women for every 1,000 men in Haryana; and the national ratio in India as a whole was 927 women for every 1,000 men. Women are not only purchased as brides or wives, but also as farm workers or househelp. Most women become “sex-slaves” or forced laborers who are later resold to human traffickers to defray the cost.

According to Punjabi writer Kirpal Kazak, bride-selling began in Jharkhand after the arrival of the Rajputs. The tribe decorate the women for sale with ornaments.  The practice of the sale of women as brides declined after the Green Revolution in India, the “spread of literacy”, and the improvement of the male-female ratio since 1911.  The ratio, however, declined in 2001.  The practice of bride-purchasing became confined to the poor sections of society such as farmers, Scheduled Castes, and tribes.  In poverty-stricken families, only one son gets married due to poverty and to “avoid the division of landed property”.

Korea 
Bride-buying in North Korea is most common due to the great poverty the country suffers and the citizens taking many risks to leave the country. Human traffickers take this as an opportunity to traffic desperate North Korean women across the country borders to China not often to sell as slaves, but mainly as brides. Upon arrival and wedlock, the women are said to be forced into labor, or sexual and physical abuse by their Chinese husbands. Although, there are successful marriages, they hardly ever last because of the illegality of North Korean citizens crossing the border without authorization, despite the women having been in the country for many years neither them or their offspring are granted citizenship. As a result, they are arrested and sent back to their homeland or kept in China to face the consequences of trespassing. Institutions around the world are requesting China to give refuge to the great number of people who fled North Korea seeking shelter, however the solicitation has not yet been approved of. In South Korea, bride-buying is not as common as it is in North Korea, though it still exists in varied ways. The majority of the brides bought in South Korea are from different parts of Asia, largely from the southeast side, in addition bride buying internationally in South Korea is claimed to be encouraged as a result of the population declining.

Vietnam 
Bride-buying in Vietnam has progressed illicitly, becoming the most debauched commercialized industry in recent history, especially around the northern mountain provinces bordering China. Virgin Vietnamese women, from 18 to 25 years old particularly, are targeted by several third-parties known as the quickie matchmaking agencies for East and Southeast Asian men from South Korea, Taiwan, China, Malaysia and Singapore. Virginity is considered the most valuable trait in this business as virgin Vietnamese women are often purchased at a higher price point. The price ranges differ among agencies; packages are valued between $5000 and $22,000USD which includes a wedding, a visa, a health examination test, and a language course. According to surveys conducted in Korea, 65% of the Vietnamese respondents only completed primary or lower secondary school. This lack of education can explain the poor social knowledge that allows this industry to grow. Vietnamese women prostitute themselves to foreigners. By selling sex for visas they are introduced to new duties which include labor and domestic servitude. The aforementioned quickie agencies usually group three to five men together to search for Vietnamese wives. This grouping of potential customers generates more profit, saving the organization approximately 50 to 60% in fees estimated to be around $85,000USD per trip.

Bride-buying in Africa 
One thing many individuals in Africa disagree on is bride-buying. In Africa, bride-buying tends to work out against women's best interest, causing many to feel a sense of gender inequality as well as a lack in the women's rights sector. In East Africa, some marriages involve transfer of valuable properties that are delivered from the families of the groom and gifted to the families of the bride. Certain phrases like bride-pricing, dowry, bride-wealth, and some indigenous words: "lobolo", "mala", "bogadi", and "chiko" all make up different codes of bride purchases.

Literature
Literature that delves into the selling women as brides includes titles such as Eho Hamara Jeevna by Punjabi novelist Dalip Kaur Tiwana, the play Ik Hor Ramayan by playwright Ajmer Singh Aulakh, Buying a Bride:An Engaging History of Mail-Order Matches by Marcia A. Zug, Object: Matrimony: The Risky Business Of Mail-Order Matchmaking On The Western Frontier by Chris Enss, the epic Vietnamese poem The Tale of Kieu  by Nguyễn Du, the novel Tat Den by Ngo Tat To, and the novel Buying the Bride by Penny Wylder.

See also
 Mail-order bride
 Picture bride
 Bride kidnapping
 Bride price
 Arranged marriage
 Arranged marriage in India
 Human trafficking in India
 Human trafficking in Vietnam
 Human trafficking in the People's Republic of China
 Wife selling
 Wife selling (English custom)
 The Bartered Bride
 Female foeticide in India
Lobolo

References

Further reading 
 Gates, Hill. Buying brides in China - again
 Gregg, William. "BUY A BRIDE"

Marriage, unions and partnerships in India
Violence against women in India
Violence against women in China
Violence against women in Vietnam
Women's rights in Asia
Violence against women
Marriage, unions and partnerships in China
Types of marriage
Arranged marriage
Human trafficking
Human trafficking in India